There are at least 80 named lakes and reservoirs in Stillwater County, Montana.

Lakes
 Arapooash Lake, el. 
 Asteroid Lake, el. 
 Aufwuchs Lake, el. 
 Avalanche Lake, el. 
 Barrier Lake, el. 
 Beckwourth Lake, el. 
 Big Foot Lake, el. 
 Big Lake, el. 
 Bill Lake, el. 
 Blueball Lake, el. 
 Brent Lake, el. 
 Brown Lake, el. 
 Cataract Lake, el. 
 Chalice Lake, el. 
 Chrome Lake, el. 
 Cimmerian Lake, el. 
 Clam Lake, el. 
 Cold Lake, el. 
 Comet Lake, el. 
 Corkscrew Lake, el. 
 Crater Lake, el. 
 Dallmann Lake, el. 
 Dreary Lake, el. 
 Dry Lake, el. 
 Dryad Lake, el. 
 Eedica Lake, el. 
 Emerald Lake, el. 
 Frenco Lake, el. 
 Froze-to-Death Lake, el. 
 Halfbreed Lake, el. 
 Heart Lake, el. 
 Hermit Lake, el. 
 Horseman Flats Lake, el. 
 Hunter Lake, el. 
 Island Lake, el. 
 Island Lake, el. 
 Jasper Lake, el. 
 Jawbone Lake, el. 
 Jay Lake, el. 
 Kid Lake, el. 
 Lake Diaphanous, el. 
 Lake Pisce, el. 
 Lake Surrender, el. 
 Lake Turgulse, el. 
 Lake Vengence, el. 
 Lake Wildness, el. 
 Lily Pad Lake, el. 
 Little Arch Lake, el. 
 Little Face Lake, el. 
 Lost Lake, el. 
 Memidgi Lake, el. 
 Mountain View Lake, el. 
 Needle Lake, el. 
 Nightmare Lake, el. 
 Nugget Lake, el. 
 Phantom Lake, el. 
 Princess Lake, el. 
 Ram Lake, el. 
 Ravin Lake, el. 
 Reeves Lake, el. 
 Roosevelt Lake, el. 
 Saderbalm Lake, el. 
 Sienna Lake, el. 
 Silver Lake, el. 
 Sioux Charley Lake, el. 
 Snowball Lakes, el. 
 Storm Lakes, el. 
 Trouble Lake, el. 
 Turco Pond, el. 
 Twin Lakes, el. 
 Upper Corkscrew Lake, el. 
 Weeluna Lake, el. 
 West Fishtail Creek Lakes, el. 
 West Rosebud Lake, el. 
 Wildcat Lakes, el. 
 Wood Lake, el. 
 Woodbine Lake, el. 
 Zoeteman Lake, el.

Reservoirs
 Hailstone Lake, el. 
 Mystic Lake, el.

See also
 List of lakes in Montana

Notes

Bodies of water of Stillwater County, Montana
Stillwater